Emlyn Watkins (21 September 1904 – 15 May 1978) was a Welsh dual-code international rugby union and professional rugby league footballer who played in the 1920s.

Background
Watkins was born in Blaina, Wales, and he died in Walsall.

Playing career

International honours
Emlyn Watkins won caps for Wales (RU) while at Blaina RFC in 1926 against Scotland, Ireland, and France, and won cap(s) for Wales (RL) while at Leeds 1926(1927) 3(1)-caps.

County honours
Emlyn Watkins played right-, i.e. number 12, in Monmouthshire's 14-18 defeat by Glamorgan in the non-County Championship match during the 1926–27 season at Taff Vale Park, Pontypridd on Saturday 30 April 1927.

References

1904 births
1978 deaths
Blaina RFC players
Dual-code rugby internationals
Leeds Rhinos players
Monmouthshire rugby league team players
Oldham R.L.F.C. players
Rugby league players from Blaina
Rugby league second-rows
Rugby union flankers
Rugby union players from Blaina
Wales international rugby union players
Wales national rugby league team players
Welsh rugby league players
Welsh rugby union players